Things on Wheels is the second remote control car racing game by Load Inc. (following Mad Tracks) for the Xbox 360 via Xbox Live Arcade and Microsoft Windows-based PCs. The game was released on May 12, 2010.

Gameplay

The gameplay is different from Load Inc.'s Mad Tracks, the game features only races with RC cars.

See also
Mad Tracks
Re-Volt

References

External links
Official Things on Wheels website

2010 video games
Focus Entertainment games
Video games developed in France
Xbox 360 Live Arcade games
Windows games
Racing video games
Toy cars and trucks